Antonio Leocadio Guzmán Águeda (Caracas, Venezuela, November 5, 1801 - November 13, 1884) was a Venezuelan politician, journalist, and military leader.  He was the father of Antonio Guzmán Blanco. He was the founder of the Liberal Party. From 1847 until 1851, he was the vice president of Venezuela, under president José Tadeo Monagas.

Early life and education
Antonio Leocadio Guzmán Águeda was born in Caracas on November 5, 1801. He was the son of Josefa Agueda Garcia and Antonio de Mata Guzmán, known as captain of the Queen battalion quartered in Caracas. In 1812 Guzman was sent to Spain by his father to avoid difficulties in Venezuela, where he was educated by liberal tutors in the Iberian Peninsula. He returned to Caracas in 1823.

See also

List of Ministers of Foreign Affairs of Venezuela

References

External links
Antonio Leocadio Guzmán at Venezuelatuya

 

 

 

 

1801 births
1884 deaths
Burials at the National Pantheon of Venezuela
Venezuelan journalists
Venezuelan Ministers of Foreign Affairs
Venezuelan soldiers
People from Caracas